Edsel Torres Gomez  a.k.a. "Negri" (born c. 1962) is a Puerto Rican drug dealer who was on the FBI most wanted list for four years and is now serving prison time in Mississippi.

Criminal career 
Torres Gomez was born in Caguas and resided at the public housing complex known as "Residencial Jose Gautier Benitez."

He was on the FBI most wanted list for four years and was also the most wanted Puerto Rican fugitive. He allegedly was the mastermind of the Cayey Massacre, in which four men were kidnapped and murdered over stolen drugs valued at about $7 million dollars (in 1994 money). One of the men, Angel Castro-Alifonso, was the main intended kidnap victim, while three other men were innocent bystanders and were showing Castro-Alifonso realty property when he was shot and they were taken.

Torres Gomez was a fugitive for four years, from 1994 to 1998, when he was captured in San Juan on April 8 of that year, by the U.S. Marshals fugitive task force.  His trial was given massive coverage by Puerto Rican media, especially by El Vocero newspaper.

On April 21, 1998, the Grand Jury for the District of Puerto Rico charged Torres Gomez with 21 violations of the U.S.C. codes 841, 846 and 848. The United States sought the death penalty against Torres Gomez; Torres Gomez and his attorneys fought against it. Edsel Torres Gomez is currently incarcerated at Federal Correctional Institution in Yazoo City, Mississippi. He is scheduled for release in 2024. His federal Inmate register Number is: 16156-069.

See also 
 List of Puerto Ricans
 Alex Trujillo
 Wes Solano
 Papo Cachete

Notes

References 

1962 births
Living people
Prisoners and detainees of the United States federal government
People from Caguas, Puerto Rico
Puerto Rican criminals